Scrobipalpa tristrigata is a moth in the family Gelechiidae. It was described by Edward Meyrick in 1938. It is found in Orientale Province of the Democratic Republic of the Congo.

References

Scrobipalpa
Moths described in 1938